The 2008 Mid-American Conference women's basketball tournament was the post-season basketball tournament for the Mid-American Conference (MAC) 2007–08 college basketball season. The 2008 tournament was held March 9–15, 2008. Miami won the championship over Ohio. Amanda Jackson of Miami was the MVP.

Format
The top two seeds in each division received byes into the quarterfinals. All rounds were held at Quicken Loans Arena.

Bracket

All-Tournament Team
Tournament MVP – Amanda Jackson, Miami

References

Mid-American Conference women's basketball tournament
2007–08 Mid-American Conference women's basketball season
MAC women's basketball tournament
MAC women's basketball tournament
Basketball competitions in Cleveland
College basketball tournaments in Ohio
Women's sports in Ohio
2000s in Cleveland